Savski gaj (English: Sava's grove) is a neighborhood in Novi Zagreb - zapad district (New Zagreb - West) of Zagreb. It is surrounded by five other quarters: Kajzerica (north, northwest), Lanište (west), Remetinec (southwest), Sveta Klara (south, southeast) and Trokut (east, northeast). It has a population of 5,113 (2011).

The quarter is made of one apartment block of 16 floors, around eleven smaller blocks and many small houses. Savski gaj has a bus stop, and a tram station. Savski gaj can be accessed from Dubrovnik avenue, Trokut, Sveta Klara, Remetinec and Lanište. Bus stop can be accessed by walking, but to access the nearest tram station one has to go through an underground passage, which leads under the Dubrovnik Avenue.

References

External links 
 novizagreb.net

Neighbourhoods of Zagreb
Novi Zagreb